100,000 (one hundred thousand) is the natural number following 99,999 and preceding 100,001. In scientific notation, it is written as 105.

Terms for 100,000 
In India, Pakistan and South Asia, one hundred thousand is called a lakh, and is written as 1,00,000.

Values of 100,000 
In astronomy, 100,000 metres, 100 kilometres, or 100 km (62 miles) is the altitude at which the Fédération Aéronautique Internationale (FAI) defines spaceflight to begin.

In the Irish language,  is a popular greeting meaning "a hundred thousand welcomes".

Selected 6-digit numbers (100,001–999,999)

100,001 to 199,999

100,001 to 199,999
 100,003 = smallest 6-digit prime number
 100,128 = smallest triangular number with 6 digits and the 447th triangular number
 100,151 = twin prime with 100,153
 100,153 = twin prime with 100,151
 100,255 = Friedman number
 101,101 = smallest palindromic Carmichael number
 101,723 = smallest prime number whose square is a pandigital number containing each digit from 0 to 9
 102,564 = The smallest parasitic number
 103,049 = little Schroeder number
 103,680 = highly totient number
 103,769 = the number of combinatorial types of 5-dimensional parallelohedra
 103,823 = 473, nice Friedman number (−1 + 0 + 3×8×2)3
 104,480 = number of non-isomorphic set-systems of weight 14.
 104,723 = the 9,999th prime number
 104,729 = the 10,000th prime number
 104,869 = the smallest prime number containing every non-prime digit
 104,976 = 184, 3-smooth number
 105,071 = number of triangle-free graphs on 11 vertices
 105,664 = harmonic divisor number
 109,376 = 1-automorphic number
 110,880 = highly composite number
 111,111 = repunit
 111,777 = smallest natural number requiring 17 syllables in American English, 19 in British English
 113,634 = Motzkin number for n = 14
 114,243/80,782 ≈ √2
 114,689 = prime factor of F12
 115,975 = Bell number
 116,281 = 3412, square number, centered decagonal number, 18-gonal number
 117,067 = first vampire prime
 117,649 = 76
 117,800 = harmonic divisor number
 120,284 = Keith number
 120,960 = highly totient number
 121,393 = Fibonacci number
 124,000 = number of Islamic prophets
 125,673 = logarithmic number
 127,777 = smallest natural number requiring 18 syllables in American English, 20 in British English
 127,912 = Wedderburn–Etherington number
 128,981 = Starts the first prime gap sequence of 2, 4, 6, 8, 10, 12, 14
 129,106 = Keith number
 130,321 = 194
 131,071 = Mersenne prime
 131,072 = 217
 131,361 = Leyland number
 134,340 = Pluto's minor planet designation
 135,137 = Markov number
 142,129 = 3772, square number, dodecagonal number
 142,857 = Kaprekar number, smallest cyclic number in decimal.
 144,000 = number with religious significance
 147,640 = Keith number
 148,149 = Kaprekar number
 152,381 = unique prime in base 20
 156,146 = Keith number
 160,000 = 204
 161,051 = 115
 161,280 = highly totient number
 166,320 = highly composite number
 167,400 = harmonic divisor number
 167,894 = number of ways to partition {1,2,3,4,5,6,7,8} and then partition each cell (block) into subcells.
 173,600 = harmonic divisor number
 174,680 = Keith number
 174,763 = Wagstaff prime
 177,147 = 311
 177,777 = smallest natural number requiring 19 syllables in American English, 21 in British English
 178,478 = Leyland number
 181,440 = highly totient number
 181,819 = Kaprekar number
 183,186 = Keith number
 183,231 = number of partially ordered set with 9 unlabeled elements
 187,110 = Kaprekar number
 194,481 = 214
 195,025 = Pell number, Markov number
 196,418 = Fibonacci number, Markov number
 196,560 = the kissing number in 24 dimensions
 196,883 = the dimension of the smallest nontrivial irreducible representation of the Monster group
 196,884 = the coefficient of q in the Fourier series expansion of the j-invariant. The adjacency of 196883 and 196884 was important in suggesting monstrous moonshine.
 199,999 = prime number.

200,000 to 299,999
 202,717 = k such that the sum of the squares of the first k primes is divisible by k.
 206,098 – Large Schröder number
 206,265 = rounded number of arc seconds in a radian (see also parsec), since  = 206,264.806...
 207,360 = highly totient number
 208,012 = the Catalan number C12
 208,335 = the largest number to be both triangular and square pyramidal
 208,495 = Kaprekar number
 212,159 = smallest unprimeable number ending in 1, 3, 7 or 9
 221,760 = highly composite number
 222,222 = repdigit
 227,475 = Riordan number
 234,256 = 224
 237,510 = harmonic divisor number
 238,591 = number of free 13-ominoes
 241,920 = highly totient number
 242,060 = harmonic divisor number
 248,832 = 100,00012, AKA a gross-great-gross (10012 great-grosses);125, the smallest fifth power that can be represented as the sum of only 6 fifth powers: 125 = 45 + 55 + 65 + 75 + 95 + 115
 262,144 = 218; exponential factorial of 4; a superperfect number
 262,468 = Leyland number
 268,705 = Leyland number
 274,177 = prime factor of the Fermat number F6
 275,807/195,025 ≈ √2
 277,200 = highly composite number
 279,841 = 234
 279,936 = 67
 280,859 = a prime number whose square 78881777881 is tridigital
 293,547 = Wedderburn–Etherington number
 294,001 = smallest weakly prime number in base 10
 294,685 = Markov number
 298,320 = Keith number

300,000 to 399,999
 310,572 = Motzkin number
 317,811 = Fibonacci number
 318,682 = Kaprekar number
 325,878 = Fine number
 326,981 = alternating factorial
 329,967 = Kaprekar number
 331,776 = 244
 332,640 = highly composite number; harmonic divisor number
 333,333 = repdigit
 333,667 = sexy prime and unique prime
 333,673 = sexy prime with 333,679
 333,679 = sexy prime with 333,673
 337,500 = 22 × 33 × 55
 351,351 = only known odd abundant number that is not the sum of some of its proper, nontrivial (i.e. >1) divisors .
 351,352 = Kaprekar number
 355,419 = Keith number
 356,643 = Kaprekar number
 360,360 = harmonic divisor number; the smallest number divisible by all of the numbers 1 through 15
 362,880 = 9!, highly totient number
 370,261 = first prime followed by a prime gap of over 100
 371,293 = 135, palindromic in base 12 (15AA5112)
 389,305 = self-descriptive number in base 7
 390,313 = Kaprekar number
 390,625 = 58
 397,585 = Leyland number

400,000 to 499,999
 409,113 = sum of the first nine factorials
 422,481 = smallest number whose fourth power is the sum of three smaller fourth powers
 423,393 = Leyland number
 426,389 = Markov number
 426,569 = cyclic number in base 12
 437,760 to 440,319 = any of these numbers will cause the Apple II+ and Apple IIe computers to crash to a monitor prompt when entered at the BASIC prompt, due to a short-cut in the Applesoft code programming of the overflow test when evaluating 16-bit numbers. Entering 440000 at the prompt has been used to hack games that are protected against entering commands at the prompt after the game is loaded.
 444,444 = repdigit
 456,976 = 264
 461,539 = Kaprekar number
 466,830 = Kaprekar number
 470,832 = Pell number
 483,840 = highly totient number
 498,960 = highly composite number
 499,393 = Markov number
 499,500 = Kaprekar number

500,000 to 599,999
 500,500 = Kaprekar number, sum of first 1,000 integers
 509,203 = Riesel number
 510,510 = the product of the first seven prime numbers, thus the seventh primorial. It is also the product of four consecutive Fibonacci numbers—13, 21, 34, 55, the highest such sequence of any length to be also a primorial. And it is a double triangular number, the sum of all even numbers from 0 to 1428.
 514,229 = Fibonacci prime, Markov prime
 518,859 = little Schroeder number
 524,287 = Mersenne prime
 524,288 = 219
 524,649 = Leyland number
 525,600 = minutes in a non-leap year
 527,040 = minutes in a leap year
 531,441 = 312
 533,169 = Leyland number
 533,170 = Kaprekar number
 537,824 = 145
 539,400 = harmonic divisor number
 548,834 = equal to the sum of the sixth powers of its digits
 554,400 = highly composite number
 555,555 = repdigit
 599,999 = prime number.

600,000 to 699,999
 604,800 = number of seconds in a week
 614,656 = 284
 625,992 = Riordan number
 646,018 = Markov number
 664,579 = the amount of primes under 10,000,000 there are
 665,280 = highly composite number
 665,857/470,832 ≈ √2
 666,666 = repdigit
 676,157 = Wedderburn–Etherington number
 678,570 = Bell number
 694,280 = Keith number
 695,520 = harmonic divisor number

700,000 to 799,999
 700,001 = prime number.
 707,281 = 294
 720,720 = superior highly composite number; colossally abundant number; the smallest number divisible by all the numbers 1 through 16
 725,760 = highly totient number
 726,180 = harmonic divisor number
 729,000 = 903
 739,397 = largest prime that is both right- and left-truncatable.
 742,900 = Catalan number
 753,480 = harmonic divisor number
 759,375 = 155
 765,623 = emirp, Friedman prime 56 × 72 − 6 ÷ 3
 777,777 = repdigit, smallest natural number requiring 20 syllables in American English, 22 in British English, largest number in English not containing the letter 'i' in its name
 799,999 = prime number.

800,000 to 899,999
 810,000 = 304
 823,543 = 77
 825,265 = smallest Carmichael number with 5 prime factors
 832,040 = Fibonacci number
 853,467 = Motzkin number
 857,375 = 953
 873,612 = 11 + 22 + 33 + 44 + 55 + 66 + 77
 888,888 = repdigit
 890,625 = 1-automorphic number

900,000 to 999,999

 900,001 = prime number
 901,971 = number of free 14-ominoes
 909,091 = unique prime in base 10
 923,521 = 314
 925,765 = Markov number
 925,993 = Keith number
 950,976 = harmonic divisor number
 967,680 = highly totient number
 998,001 = the reciprocal of this number, in its expanded form, lists all three-digit numbers in order except 998.
 998,991 = highest triangular number with 6 digits and the 1,413th triangular number
 999,983 = largest 6-digit prime number
 999,999 = repdigit. Rational numbers with denominators 7 and 13 have 6-digit repetends when expressed in decimal form, because 999999 is the smallest number one less than a power of 10 that is divisible by 7 and by 13, largest number in English not containing the letter 'l' in its name.

Prime numbers
Increments of 105 from zero through a  million have the following prime counts:
9,592 primes between 0 and 100,000.
99,991 is the largest prime number less than 100,000.

8,392 primes between 100,000 and 200,000. 
This is a difference of 1,200 primes from the previous range.
104,729 is the 10,000th prime in this range.
199,999 is prime.

8,013 primes between 200,000 and 300,000. 
A difference of 379 primes from the previous range.
224,737 is the 20,000th prime.

7,863 primes between 300,000 and 400,000. 
A difference of 150 primes from the previous range.
350,377 is the 30,000th prime.

7,678 primes between 400,000 and 500,000. 
A difference of 185 primes from the previous range. 
Here, the difference increases by a count of 35.
479,909 is the 40,000th prime.

 7,560 primes between 500,000 and 600,000. 
A difference of 118 primes from the previous range.
7,560 is the twentieth highly composite number.
599,999 is prime.

7,445 primes between 600,000 and 700,000. 
A difference of 115 primes from the previous range.
611,953 is the 50,000th prime.

7,408 primes between 700,000 and 800,000. 
A difference of 37 primes from the previous range.
700,001 and 799,999 are both prime. 
746,773 is the 60,000th prime.

7,323 primes between 800,000 and 900,000. 
A difference of 85 primes from the previous range.
Here, the difference increases by a count of 48. 
882,377 is the 70,000th prime.

7,224 primes between 900,000 and 1,000,000. 
A difference of 99 primes from the previous range. 
The difference increases again, by a count of 14.
900,001 is prime.

In total, there are 68,906 prime numbers between 100,000 and 1,000,000.

Notes

References

Integers